Thunder Bay District is a district and census division in Northwestern Ontario in the Canadian province of Ontario. The district seat is Thunder Bay.

In 2016, the population was 146,048. Most of the district (93.5%) is unincorporated and part of the Unorganized Thunder Bay District.

History
Thunder Bay District was created in 1871 by provincial statute from the western half of Algoma District, named after a large bay on the north shore of Lake Superior. Its northern and western boundaries were uncertain until Ontario's right to Northwestern Ontario was determined by the Judicial Committee of the Privy Council. Until about 1902 it was often called Algoma West from the name of the provincial constituency established in 1885.

The following districts include areas that were formerly part of Thunder Bay District:
Rainy River, created in 1885
Kenora, created in 1907 from Rainy River District
Cochrane, created in 1921

Subdivisions

Municipalities
 City of Thunder Bay
 Municipality (town) of Greenstone
 Town of Marathon
 Township of Conmee
 Township of Dorion
 Township of Gillies
 Township of Manitouwadge
 Municipality (township) of Neebing
 Township of Nipigon
 Township of O'Connor
 Municipality (township) of Oliver Paipoonge
 Township of Red Rock
 Township of Schreiber
 Township of Shuniah
 Township of Terrace Bay

First Nations and their Indian Reserves
 Animbiigoo Zaagi'igan Anishinaabek First Nation: Lake Nipigon
 Aroland First Nation: Aroland Settlement (Aroland 83)
 Biinjitiwaabik Zaaging Anishinaabek First Nation (Rocky Bay): Rocky Bay 1
 Bingwi Neyaashi Anishinaabek First Nation (Sand Point)
 Fort William First Nation: Fort William 52
 Ginoogaming First Nation: Ginoogaming (Long Lac 77)
 Kiashke Zaaging Anishinaabek First Nation (Gull Bay): Gull River 55
 Lac des Mille Lacs First Nation: Lac des Mille Lacs 22A1, Seine River 22A2
 Long Lake 58 First Nation: Long Lake 58
 Namaygoosisagagun First Nation (non-status)
 Netmizaaggamig Nishnaabeg: Pic Mobert North, Pic Mobert South
 Ojibway Nation of Saugeen First Nation (Savant Lake): Ojibway Nation of Saugeen
 Ojibways of the Pic River First Nation: Pic River 50
 Pays Plat First Nation: Pays Plat 51
 Red Rock First Nation (Lake Helen): Lake Helen 53A, Red Rock 53
 Seine River First Nation: Seine River 23A, Seine River 23B
 Whitesand First Nation: Armstrong Settlement, Whitesand

Unorganized areas
 Thunder Bay, Unorganized (including the local services boards of Armstrong, East Gorham, Hurkett, Kaministiquia, Lappe, Nolalu, Rossport, Savant Lake, Shebandowan, and Upsala)

Demographics

Further reading 
 Arthur, Elizabeth. Thunder Bay District, 1821-1892: A Collection of Documents. Toronto: Champlain Society Publications, 1973.

See also

Edward Island (Lake Superior)
Esnagami Lake
List of Ontario Census Divisions
List of townships in Ontario
List of secondary schools in Ontario#Thunder Bay District

References